Allison Miller is an American actress. She is best known for playing Michelle Benjamin on the NBC series Kings, Skye Tate on the Fox series Terra Nova, and Carrie on the NBC series Go On. She starred as Laura Larson on the Syfy television series Incorporated. She is currently starring in ABC's A Million Little Things.

Early life
Miller was born in Rome, Italy, to American parents Margo and John Winn Miller. Her father is the former publisher of The Olympian newspaper in Olympia, Washington.

During her childhood, Miller moved often, growing up mostly in Lexington, Kentucky, before starting high school in State College, Pennsylvania, and finishing at Maclay School in Tallahassee, Florida.

Miller briefly attended Boston University before attending Rhodes College for her freshman year, and then transferring to the University of Florida in Gainesville. She is a member of Kappa Delta sorority, and was featured in a story in Kappa Delta's newsletter The Angelos.

In 2006, Miller dropped out of college and moved to Hollywood to pursue her acting career full-time. She has training in voice and tap, jazz, and modern dance. She is a mezzo-soprano and plays the piano and the guitar. She is proficient in Spanish and French.

Career
Miller started her career as member of the Young Actors Theatre in Tallahassee, Florida. She appeared as Nora in the play Brighton Beach Memoirs for the theatre.

Miller first appeared on television In 2004, when she was one of eight actresses chosen as finalists to play Laurie in the VH-1 reality show In Search of the New Partridge Family. Other television roles included an appearance in Lucy's Piano (2006) and episodes of General Hospital, CSI: NY, Desperate Housewives, and Boston Legal.

Miller appeared as a series regular on the NBC television drama series Kings, which was based on the biblical story of David. She portrayed Princess Michelle Benjamin, an analogue of Michal (daughter of Saul and first wife of David). The series lasted only one season.

Miller appeared in two 2009 films: a live action version of Blood: The Last Vampire and 17 Again.

In 2011, Miller co-starred as Skye Tate in the single season of the series Terra Nova. In 2012, she started appearing in the NBC comedy Go On, which was cancelled after one season.

In 2014, Miller starred in Devil's Due, a found-footage horror film.

Miller played the lead role in the drama film There's Always Woodstock, released March 19, 2014 at the Gasparilla International Film Festival.

Miller had a recurring role as Julia Howser in the ABC sitcom Selfie, which was cancelled after its sixth episode.

Miller starred in the Syfy television series Incorporated.

She played the role of Sonya Struhl, a lawyer who defends Liberty High School in the second season of the Netflix original series 13 Reasons Why. The second season was released on May 18, 2018.

Her most recent role in the ABC drama, A Million Little Things, is in its third season. Miller plays Maggie Bloom. The drama series has been renewed for a fifth season.

Personal life
Miller married comedian and actor Adam Nee in 2012. In January 2019, the couple announced that they were filing for divorce. Miller currently lives in Los Angeles.

Filmography

References

External links

Young Actors Theatre (July 9, 2008)

21st-century American actresses
Actresses from Kentucky
Actresses from Rome
Actresses from Tallahassee, Florida
American film actresses
American television actresses
Living people
Actors from Lexington, Kentucky
Rhodes College alumni
Leon High School alumni
Year of birth missing (living people)